The Guns of August (1962) (published in the UK as August 1914) is a volume of history by Barbara W. Tuchman. It is centered on the first month of World War I. After introductory chapters, Tuchman describes in great detail the opening events of the conflict. Its focus then becomes a military history of the contestants, chiefly the great powers.

The Guns of August thus provides a narrative of the earliest stages of World War I, from the decisions to go to war, up until the start of the Franco-British offensive that stopped the German advance into France. The result was four years of trench warfare. In the course of her narrative Tuchman includes discussion of the plans, strategies, world events, and international sentiments before and during the war.

The book was awarded the Pulitzer Prize for General Non-Fiction for publication year 1963, and proved very popular. Tuchman later returned to the subject of the social attitudes and issues that existed before World War I, which she had touched upon in The Guns of August, in a collection of eight essays published in 1966 under the title The Proud Tower: A Portrait of the World Before the War, 1890–1914.

Summary

A funeral
In May 1910 the funeral of Edward VII of the United Kingdom drew the presence of nine kings, one being Kaiser Wilhelm II of Germany. Wilhelm, or William, was Edward's nephew. The opening chapter begins and ends with a description of the royal funeral and in between provides a discussion of the continent's political alliances and the diplomacy of royalty, all amidst the national rivalries, imperialism, and social Darwinism in the years leading up to the Great War (1914–1918).

Plans
Chapters 2 to 5 are grouped into a section called "Plans". Addressed is prewar military planning, as done by the major powers in Europe. Included are the German Schlieffen plan, France's offensive Plan XVII, joint British and French arrangements, and Russia's approach to a future European war.

Outbreak
"Outbreak" starts with a short introduction, which briefly mentions the event that triggered World War I. On June 28, 1914, in Sarajevo, Gavrilo Princip, a Serbian nationalist, assassinated the heir apparent to the throne of Austria-Hungary, the Archduke Franz Ferdinand and his wife Sophie, Duchess of Hohenberg. European-wide diplomacy and military preparations during July are then referenced.

Chapters 6 to 9 commence with August 1914. Discussed and probed are maneuvers by leading politicians, diplomatic affairs, and actions undertaken by various armies, during the opening days of the war, August 1 to August 4. Covered are the Kaiser's hesitation, the struggle by Russia to ensure that its ally, France, would join in the war, France's attempts to win a guarantee from Britain of her involvement, and Germany's ultimatum to Belgium.

Battle
The bulk of the remainder of the book, chapters 10 to 22, is essentially devoted to the battles and tactical planning on two fronts, the Western (chapters 11 to 14, 17, and 19 to 22) and the Eastern (chapters 15 and 16). However, Austria, and the Balkans, are omitted. Chapters 10 and 18 are devoted to the war at sea.

Intertwined in the narration are the adverse effects of the vanity of the various leaders and insubordination. Also addressed are some perceptions made among those in the rest of the world, including a critical interpretation of events that cemented various political views (such as chapter 17). The short "Afterword" then reflects on events of August 1914.

Mediterranean
Tuchman starts the "Battle" section by covering the search by Allied naval forces for the German battlecruiser  in the Mediterranean (chapter 10). The Goeben finally took refuge in the Dardanelles, waters of the then neutral Ottoman Empire. Such naval actions set off diplomatic maneuvers, but the event precipitated Turkey's entry into the war on the side of Germany. The development worked to block Russian import/export via its year-round ports on the Black Sea. That, in turn, led to the disastrous Gallipoli Campaign.

Western Front
Chapters 11 to 14 cover the war in western Europe. First discussed are the German invasion northeast of Belgium and the general Western Front, especially the situation in Alsace. Next, Tuchman describes the arrival in France of the British Expeditionary Force (chapter 12).

As they crossed the Belgian frontier, the German armies were engaged by the Belgian army in front of Liège, and in the east of France, by five French armies, and in the south of Belgium, by four British divisions (known as the British Expeditionary Force). The French were said to be labouring under the delusion that Gallic élan would be crucial in countering German attacks while the British fought hard at the Battle of Mons. In August, each side deployed its armed forces in order to effect its own strategies developed in advance of the war (discussed in "Plans").

The French High Command had made incomplete allowances for dealing with the large massed attack by the German army, which now came quickly bearing down on them. It was perhaps through the decisions of Charles Lanrezac, the French Fifth Army commander, who acted in a timely fashion before getting permission from Joseph Joffre, that the entire French line was eventually saved from envelopment and general collapse. Although his pleas were ignored, Lanrezac withdrew his forces at Charleroi from an untenable position and probable destruction, and he redeployed them more favorably. He was later relieved of command.

The Battle of the Frontiers was brutal. The Belgian army was rushed against the German army, but the Allies were forced to retreat slowly under the German onslaught until the Germans were within 40 miles (64 km) of Paris. The city was saved through the courage and verve of a semiretired territorial general, Joseph Gallieni, who marshalled his limited resources and saved the day. The city was preparing for siege and possible complete destruction, and the government had fled south, when two divisions of reserves suddenly arrived and were rushed to the front by the city's fleet of 600 taxi cabs. Tuchman cynically notes that Joffre later took complete credit for saving Paris and the French army after having the commander who ordered the tactical retreat, Lanrezac, relieved of duty and the old commander and his former superior, Gallieni, pushed back into obscurity.

Tuchman is also careful to point out that although many of Joffre's actions were shameful, when he was finally pushed into action, he showed great skill in guiding the hastily improvised counterblow that crashed into the invader's flank. The Germans greatly contributed to their own undoing by outrunning their supply lines, pushing their infantry to the point of physical collapse and deviating from the original invasion plan, which called for the right flank to be protected from counterattack. At that stage of its offensive, the German army lacked the troops used by the siege of the fortress of Antwerp, held by the Belgian army. Both sides were plagued by poor communication and general staffs that were heavily invested with politics and sycophancy. Dire warnings from commanders in the field were ignored when they did not fit preconceived notions of quick victory at low cost.

Tuchman introduces all of the key players, both the Allied (French, British, Belgian and Russian) and the German commanders. Their personalities, strengths, and weaknesses are discussed.
 Joseph Joffre, French General, Chief of Staff of the Grand Quartier Général
 Lord Kitchener, the British Secretary of State for War
 Helmuth von Moltke, Chief of the German General Staff
 Alexander von Kluck, commander of the German far right wing
 Wilhelm II, German Emperor and King of Prussia (aka "The Kaiser")
  Albert I, King of the Belgians
 French President Raymond Poincaré, Britain's First Lord of the Admiralty Winston Churchill, and a young soldier named Charles de Gaulle, who fought for France

Russia and Germany
Only chapters 15 and 16 are devoted to the Eastern Front, and center on the Russian invasion of East Prussia and the German reaction to it, culminating in the Battle of Tannenberg, where the Russian advance was stopped, decisively.

In the chapters, Tuchman covers the series of errors, faulty plans, poor communications, and poor logistics, which, among other things, decidedly helped the French in the west. For example, the Germans mistakenly transferred, from the west, two corps to defend against what the book refers to as the 'Russian Steam Roller'. The great misery that developed on the Eastern Front is noted.

Flames of Louvain
Woven into the text about the battles in Belgium are threads of fact that Allied governments would employ in the formation of the West's eventual opinion that Germany had been the aggressor nation against Belgium. Such facts and conclusions would be repeated for the duration of the war and greatly affect the future involvement of the United States.

Also here in chapter 17 The Flames of Louvain, Tuchman places a selection of German views from a variety of sources as to the aims and desires of Germany. She cites Thomas Mann as saying the goal was "the establishment of the German idea in history, the enthronement of Kultur, the fulfillment of Germany's historical mission". She then conveys American reporter Irvin S. Cobb's account of an interview with a 'German scientist': "Germany [is] for progress. German Kultur will enlighten the world and after this war there will never be another." Yet further, a 'German businessman' opines that the war will give Europe "a new map, and Germany will be at the center of it" (aims similar to the Septemberprogramm). Such outspoken menace worked to solidify opposition to Germany, caused George Bernard Shaw to become "fed up" at Prussian Militarism, and H.G. Wells to condemn the German "war god" and hope for an end to all armed conflict.

Chapter 17's main focus is the German army's atrocities in Belgium, in particular against the historic university city of Louvain. Tuchman frames her remarks by describing the Schrecklichkeit, the German military's "theory of terror". Accordingly, in a failed attempt to suppress the "illegal" franc-tireur (civilians shooting at German troops), hundreds of nearby citizens at several Belgium towns had been executed. Her accounts of the ferocity of such German army reprisals against the general population and of the willful burning of Louvain, such as its university library make it obvious why the Western Allies might feel themselves justified to condemn Germany and Germans wholesale.

War at sea

Chapter 18 describes the British fear that since their island nation was dependent on overseas imports, the German navy could manage to disrupt their international trade. Although Britain's navy was superior in ships and experience, perhaps the German navy's "best opportunity for a successful battle was in the first two or three weeks of the war." However, the German High Seas Fleet remained in port and was ordered not to challenge the British warships watching the North Sea. Thus, a substantial control over the world's seaways was then exerted by the British Royal Navy.

Surrounding the neutral role of the United States, diplomatic politicking quickly intensified. On August 6, Washington formally requested the Europeans to agree to follow the 1908 Declaration of London, which "favored the neutrals' right to trade as against the belligerents' right to blockade." Germany agreed. Britain "said Yes and meant No" and supplemented an Order of Council on August 20 (the 100th anniversary of Britain's burning of Washington). Despite the equitable intent of international law, Britain sought to receive supplies from America while its naval blockade of Germany denied the supplies to Germany. Woodrow Wilson had already advised Americans on August 18 to be "neutral in fact as well as in name, impartial in thought as well as in action" so that America might become the "impartial mediator" that could then bring "standards of righteousness and humanity" to the belligerents in order to negotiate "a peace without victory" in Europe. Both wartime paper profits from a nearly fourfold increase in trade with Britain and France and "German folly" eventually would later work to cause American entry into World War I.

Paris defended
The book's last four chapters (19–22) describe the fighting in France up to the beginning of the First Battle of the Marne. The French and British forces, united at last, fell on Alexander von Kluck's exposed right flank in what would be the first successful offensive by the Allies. In the subsequent attack, the Germans were forced back north, with both sides suffering terrible losses. While Paris had been saved, the war took on a new cast, with both sides settling into a defensive trench system, which cut across France and Belgium from the Channel to Switzerland. That became known as the Western Front, and over the next four years, it would consume a generation of young men.

Afterword
Tuchman briefly offers reflections on the First Battle of the Marne and on the war in general. The war's opening "produced deadlock on the Western Front. Sucking up lives at the rate of 5,000 and sometimes 50,000 a day, absorbing munitions, energy, money, brains, and trained men," it ate up its contestants. "The nations were caught in a trap...."

With time, such a war would become intolerable. "Men could not sustain a war of such magnitude and pain without hope–the hope that its very enormity would ensure that it could never happen again."

Miscalculations leading to war
Throughout the aforementioned narrative, Tuchman constantly brings up a theme: the numerous misconceptions, miscalculations, and mistakes that she believed resulted in the tragedy of trench warfare, such as:
 Economic miscalculation: Tuchman says both European intellectuals and leaders overestimated the power of free trade. They believed that the interconnectedness of European nations through trade would stop a continent-wide war from breaking out, as the economic consequences would be too great. However, the assumption was incorrect. For example, Tuchman noted that Moltke, when warned of such consequences, refused to even consider them in his plans, arguing he was a "soldier," not an "economist."
 Unfounded belief in quick warfare: except for a very few politicians (who were at the time ridiculed and excluded because of their views, with only Lord Kitchener having the authority to act on his anticipation of a long war), all the leaders of the major combatants believed the war would be concluded in a matter of weeks, certainly by the end of 1914. Tuchman recounted the story of a British statesman who, after he warned others that the war might last two or three years, was branded a "pessimist." That false assumption had disastrous effects, especially on logistics (see below).
 Over-reliance on morale and the offensive: Tuchman details, in depth, how the leaders of the major powers, before the war, developed a philosophy of warfare based almost entirely on morale, a constant offensive, and retaining the initiative. Joffre, in particular, refused to consider going on the defensive/or even to slow the offensive, even when the realities of the battlefield demonstrated that his approach was not working.
 Failure to consider political backlash: many war planners did not take into consideration the political and treaty-based consequences of their offensive actions. As Tuchman argues, the German leaders in particular refused to consider the consequences of moving their armies into Belgium despite that country's neutrality. Despite Moltke's concerns, German generals insisted on moving through Belgium because they needed to maneuver. They failed (or refused) to realize that by invading Belgium, they effectively forced Britain to declare war because of existing treaties and national honor.
 Outdated forms of wartime etiquette: although the technology, aims, methods, and plans of World War I were significantly different from earlier wars, military leaders in occupied territories continued to have an expectation of a form of martial etiquette from civilians, regarding co-operation and obedience of instructions, as a reciprocal part of non-combatant status; which increased resentment between the citizens of the opposing nations. To illustrate, Tuchman repeatedly uses quotes from the diaries of German generals who commandeered the homes and supplies of civilians. One recurrent theme in their diary entries was that they simply could not understand why the property owners refused full co-operation, in line with traditional wartime courtesy. In a somewhat comical passage, Tuchman even quotes from a general who criticized the master of a Belgian house for failing to sit with him at dinner and observe proper mealtime etiquette despite the fact that the Germans had violated his country's neutrality, taken over his house, and stolen or destroyed much of his property.  Similar problems occurred in the practical application of submarine, and later aerial, warfare.

Overall, Tuchman argues that while some of the war's major combatants looked forward to a war, specifically Germany and Austria-Hungary, all of them expected it to be a short one, and none of them desired or anticipated a prolonged war. Likewise, she argues that even successes, such as the First Battle of the Marne, a French victory, were to some extent accidental victories that were won despite, and not because of, military leadership or strategy.

Cultural impact
The book was an immediate bestseller and was on the bestseller list of The New York Times for 42 consecutive weeks. The Pulitzer Prize nomination committee was unable to award it the prize for outstanding history because Joseph Pulitzer's will specifically stated that the recipient of the Pulitzer Prize for History must be a book on American history. Instead, Tuchman was given the prize for general nonfiction.

According to the cover notes of an audio version of The Guns of August, "[President John F. Kennedy] was so impressed by the book, he gave copies to his cabinet and principal military advisers, and commanded them to read it."  In his book One Minute to Midnight about the Cuban Missile Crisis, Michael Dobbs notes the deep impression Guns had on Kennedy. He often quoted from it and wanted "every officer in the Army" to read it as well. Subsequently, "[t]he secretary of the Army sent copies to every U.S. military base in the world.  Kennedy drew from The Guns of August to help in dealing with the crisis in Cuba, including the profound and unpredictable implications a rapid escalation of the situation could have. Robert S. McNamara, United States Secretary of Defense during Kennedy's presidency, recalled that "[e]arly in his administration, President Kennedy asked his cabinet officials and members of the National Security Council" to read The Guns of August. McNamara related that Kennedy said The Guns of August graphically portrayed how Europe's leaders had bungled into the debacle of World War I, and that Kennedy told later his cabinet officials that "We are not going to bungle into war."

The British Prime Minister Harold Macmillan, who had served on the Western Front during the First World War, was also profoundly affected by the book. In his diary for Monday, 22 October 1962, he wrote:

Graham Allison, a political scientist who covered the Cuban Missile Crisis in Essence of Decision, noted the effect of Tuchman's book on Kennedy, but also its implications for the proper study of decision-making and warfare. Allison created an entire model of decision-making, which he called the Organizational Process Model, based on such issues as those covered by Tuchman, a model that directly countered game theory and other rationalistic means of explaining events.

Tuchman in the narrative 
While she did not explicitly mention it in The Guns of August, Tuchman was present for one of the pivotal events of the book: the pursuit of the German battle cruiser Goeben and light cruiser Breslau. In her account of the pursuit she wrote, "That morning [August 10, 1914] there arrived in Constantinople the small Italian passenger steamer which had witnessed the Gloucesters action against Goeben and Breslau. Among its passengers were the daughter, son-in-law and three grandchildren of the American ambassador Mr. Henry Morgenthau." As she was a grandchild of Henry Morgenthau, she is referring to herself, which is confirmed in her later book Practicing History, in which she tells the story of her father, Maurice Wertheim, traveling from Constantinople to Jerusalem on August 29, 1914, to deliver funds to the Jewish community there. Thus, at age two, Tuchman was present during the pursuit of Goeben and Breslau, which she documented 48 years later.

Film adaptation
The book was the basis for a 1964 documentary film, also titled The Guns of August.  The 99-minute film, which premiered in New York City on December 24, 1964, was produced and directed by Nathan Kroll and narrated by Fritz Weaver, with the narration written by Arthur B. Tourtellot. It used film footage found in government archives in Paris, London, Brussels, Berlin, and Washington, DC.

 References Informational notesCitations'

External links
 

1962 non-fiction books
Pulitzer Prize for General Non-Fiction-winning works
History books about World War I
Macmillan Publishers books
Cultural depictions of Gavrilo Princip